Innokentiy Temofeevech "Jim" Zimin (26 November 190231 August 1974) was a Russian Empire-born Australian peanut farmer. He was born in Sretensk, Siberia, Russia and died in Katherine, Northern Territory, Australia. Zimin designed and built his own peanut digger, which was to receive, in 1949, the first agricultural patent awarded to a resident of the Northern Territory.

Life
Zimin was born on 26 November 1902 in Sretensk, Siberia, Russia Empire, the son of Tomefoy Nikolaevisch Zimin. Following the Russian Civil War he moved to Harbin, China and was trained as a chauffeur and mechanic at the Young Men's Christian Association. Zimin emigrated to Australia in 1927 where he found employment in Queensland; in 1929, he acquired government land meant for peanut farming near the Adelaide River, and founded I. T. Zimin & Co. with five Russian partners. Their operations received little funding and harvesting was manual; while successful, the venture ceased in 1930, whereupon Zimin relocated to Katherine. Three years later, he bought a plot of land near the Katherine River; and following another three years, he acquired a peanut farm on the riverbank. In two years, Zimin's germination seed was reportedly the best locally and in 1949 he received the first ever agricultural patent awarded to a Northern Territory resident for his own peanut digger. However, due to a myriad problems including erratic weather and market fluctuations, Zimin started growing other crops including cotton and millet. After the bombing of Darwin in February 1942, Zimin began supplying fresh produce to the troops stationed nearby. The 121st Australian General Hospital was built on land that Zimin owned and opened in 1942. Faced with dwindling demand and other dastardly conditions—capped by a flood in 1957—Zimin started working for the Commonwealth Scientific and Industrial Research Organization and sold off most of his land by 1971. He died on 31 August 1974 in Katherine and was buried in the local cemetery.

References

Australian farmers
Emigrants from the Russian Empire to China
Chinese emigrants to Australia
1902 births
1974 deaths